Christian Herrmann (born 16 January 1966) is a retired German football player.

References

External links
 

1966 births
Living people
German footballers
FC Schalke 04 players
FC 08 Homburg players
VfL Bochum players
Bundesliga players
2. Bundesliga players
Association football defenders